University of Computer Studies, Taungoo is located at Taungoo, Bago Division, Myanmar. It was formerly known as Government Computer College, Taungoo. Computer University (Taung-Ngu) was first opened on 4 September 2000 as a College in Katumati Myo Thit, Taung-Ngu. On 20 January 2007, it was promoted into university level and was transferred to the campus of Technology University(Taung-Ngu)in Kanyo village on 20 April 2008.

Faculties
Department of Myanmar 
Department of English
Computer Software Technology Department
Computer Hardware Technology Department
Information Science Department
Computer Application Department
Cisco Lab
Computer Lab
Embedded Lab
Hardware Lab
Network Lab
Research Lab
Virtualization Lab
Language Lab
Physics Lab
International Relations Office
Faculty of Computer Science (FCS)
Faculty of Information Science (FIS)
Information Technologies Support and Maintenance (ITSM)
Faculty of Computer System and Technologies (FCST)
Faculty of Computing (FC)
Department of Language
Department of Natural Science
Department of Administration
Department of Finance
Department of Student Affairs

Degree Programs
The University of Computer Studies, Taungoo offers the following degree  programs :

Graduate Programs

References

Further reading
www.ucst.edu.mm

Universities and colleges in Taungoo
Universities and colleges in Bago Region
Arts and Science universities in Myanmar
Technological universities in Myanmar